Tristán Bauer (born 22 June 1959) is an Argentine film maker, screenwriter and politician. Since 10 December 2019, he has been Argentina's Minister of Culture in the cabinet of President Alberto Fernández.

He breakout film was the 1991 drama Después de la tormenta ("After the Storm"), which received the New Directors Award at the 1990 San Sebastián Festival and eight Silver Condor awards, including best picture and best director. He also received the best director and best picture Silver Condor Awards for his documentary Cortázar (1994), and best artistic direction and best screenplay adaptation for Iluminados por el fuego (2005); the latter of which also received the Goya Award for best foreign film in the Spanish language.

From 2008 to 2013, Bauer served as director of the National Media System of Argentina. He was responsible for the foundation of Canal Encuentro, a TV network dependent on Argentina's Ministry of Education, and is a member of the board of directors of the Latin American network teleSUR.

Filmography

Director
Tierra Arrasada (2019)El Camino De Santiago (2018)Che, un hombre nuevo (2010)Iluminados por el fuego (2005)Los libros y la noche (1999)Evita, una tumba sin paz, mediometraje (1997)Cortázar (1994)El oficio de amar, mediometraje (1993)Después de la tormenta (1991)Ni tan blancos, ni tan indios, short film (1984)

ScreenwriterIluminados por el fuego (2005)Los libros y la noche (1999)Cortázar (1994)Después de la tormenta'' (1991)

References

See also
Cinema of Argentina

Living people
1959 births
Argentine screenwriters
People from Mar del Plata
Ministers of Culture of Argentina